Martin Strimitzer (10 November 1928 – 10 December 2021) was an Austrian politician. A member of the Austrian People's Party, he served in the Federal Council from 1982 to 1992 and was its President from January to June 1990. He died on 10 December 2021, at the age of 93.

References

1928 births
2021 deaths
20th-century Austrian politicians
Austrian People's Party politicians
Presidents of the Austrian Federal Council
Members of the Federal Council (Austria)
People from Spittal an der Drau District